Guéhiébly (also spelled Guéhiébli) is a town in western Ivory Coast. It is a sub-prefecture of Duékoué Department in Guémon Region, Montagnes District.

Guéhiébly was a commune until March 2012, when it became one of 1126 communes nationwide that were abolished.

In 2014, the population of the sub-prefecture of Guéhiébly was 51,933.

Villages
The 8 villages of the sub-prefecture of Guéhiébly and their population in 2014 are:
 Bahé-Sébon (12 011)
 Delobly (2 255)
 Diéhiba (11 767)
 Diourouzon (12 857)
 Gozon (3 551)
 Guéhiébly (5 018)
 Guinglo-Sropan (2 509)
 Séhoun-Guiglo (1 965)

Notes

Sub-prefectures of Guémon
Former communes of Ivory Coast